The 2005 Wismilak International was a women's tennis tournament played on outdoor hard courts. It was the 12th edition of the Commonwealth Bank Tennis Classic, and was part of the Tier III Series of the 2005 WTA Tour. It took place at the Grand Hyatt Bali in Bali, Indonesia, from 12 through 18 September 2005. Lindsay Davenport won the singles title.

Points and prize money

Point distribution

Prize money

* per team

Singles main-draw entrants

Seeds 

Rankings are as of 29 August 2005

Other entrants 

The following players received wildcards into the singles main draw:
  Wynne Prakusya
  Virginia Ruano Pascual

The following players received entry from the qualifying draw:
  Martina Müller
  Sun Tiantian
  Yan Zi
  Tomoko Yonemura

Retirements 
  Patty Schnyder (illness)

Doubles main-draw entrants

Seeds

Other entrants
The following pairs received wildcards into the doubles main draw:
  Cho Yoon-jeong /  Li Na
  Francesca Schiavone /  Karolina Šprem

The following pair received entry from the qualifying draw:
  Ryōko Fuda /  Aiko Nakamura

Finals

Singles

  Lindsay Davenport defeated  Francesca Schiavone, 6–2, 6–4.
It was the 4th title of the season for Davenport and the 49th title in her singles career.

Doubles

  Anna-Lena Grönefeld /  Meghann Shaughnessy defeated  Yan Zi /  Zheng Jie, 6–3, 6–3.
It was the 3rd title for Grönefeld and the 12th title for Shaughnessy in their respective doubles careers.

References

External links
 Official results archive (ITF)
 Official results archive (WTA)

Wismilak International
2005
2005 in Indonesian tennis